This is a list of films about baseball, featuring notable films where baseball plays a central role in the development of the plot.

See also
 List of sports films
 List of highest-grossing sports films

References

Baseball films
Films
Baseball